"Real a Lie" (also known as "Real, a Lie") is the second single from Auf der Maur's self-titled solo debut. The song failed to chart in the United States, however, due to a successful tour of the United Kingdom, it fared slightly better than "Followed the Waves" there, peaking at #33.

Background and production
"Real a Lie" was one of the many songs written by Melissa Auf der Maur over a 12-year period from 1992 to 2004. Originally titled "Realalie", the song was first performed by her original band, Tinker, which also included co-writer Steve Durand, and was released as the band's second single in 1994, which was backed with the b-side "Saxon Princess." Auf der Maur later reworked the song during the recording sessions for Auf der Maur in 2003-4 featuring a layer Wall of sound of guitars and reworked lyrics. The song was featured as the third track on the album.

Track listing and formats
CD single
"Real a Lie" – 4:22 (Auf der Maur, Steve Durand)
"My Foggy Notion" (demo version) – 4:13 (Auf der Maur)

Maxi single
"Real a Lie" – 4:22
"Afraid" – 3:38 (Christa Paeffgen)
"Taste You" (acoustic) – 4:49 (Auf der Maur)
"Real a Lie" (enhanced video)

Limited UK 7" vinyl single
"Real a Lie" – 4:22
"Afraid" – 3:38

European promo CD
"Real a Lie" (radio edit) – 3:33
"Real a Lie" (album version) – 4:22

Music video
A promotional music video was created for the single in 2004 and released on May 3, 2004. The video is compiled of photographs of Auf der Maur performing "Real a Lie" and was recorded in still motion.

Chart positions

Musicians and personnel

Musicians and performers
Melissa Auf der Maur – lead vocals, bass, additional guitar
Steve Durand  – lead guitar
Chris Goss – additional guitar, backing vocals
Jordon Zadorozny – additional guitar
Jeordie White – additional guitar
Brant Bjork – drums
John Stanier – additional drums
Nick Oliveri – additional bass, backing vocals
Kelli Scott – additional drums
Atom Willard – additional drums

Production personnel
Chris Goss – producer, engineer
Melissa Auf der Maur – additional production
Martin Schmelzle – engineer
Matt Mahaffey – engineer, mixer (on "Afraid")
Ben Grosse – mixer

References

2004 singles
Melissa Auf der Maur songs
Capitol Records singles
Songs written by Melissa Auf der Maur
2004 songs